These are the results for the 1999 UCI Road World Championships bicycle race road race. The men's elite race was held on Sunday October 10, 1999, in Verona, Italy, over a total distance of 260 kilometres (16 laps). There were a total number of 172 starters, with 49 cyclists finishing the race.

Final classification

References
Results

Men's Road Race
UCI Road World Championships – Men's road race

nl:Wereldkampioenschap wielrennen 1999